Hugo Ludik (born 25 September 1983, South Africa) is a retired Namibian cricketer and also a musician.

Having first participated in the Under-19s World Cup of 2002, Ludik later took part in two tournaments involving the Zimbabwean cricket team, the first of which took place in his adopted homeland in August 2003. Ludik had previously appeared in seven Youth One-day Internationals before joining the senior team. Ludik represented Namibia during the 2005 ICC Trophy. Ludik played for the Namibian National side from 2003 to 2007.

Ludik is also a successful recording artist and songwriter. In 2008, he won the Huisgenoot Tempo songwriting contest for co-writing the Kurt Darren track "Papsopwinterwaternat". In 2010, Ludik also formed the band ADAM, a successful Afrikaans pop-rock trio, who, in 2011, released their debut self-titled album. The group has to date reached the number 1 spot on four different radio stations with their first single, "Liefde Soldaat", and are also in the Top 10 best sellers of 2011 in the Afrikaans market.

Ludik's family consists of: father Paul (forensic scientist), mother Susan (insurance broker) and brother, Stefan – also a musician and actor.

External links 
 Hugo Ludik at Cricket Archive 

1983 births
Living people
Namibian cricketers
Wicket-keepers